Ali Reza (also spelled Alireza or Ali-Reza) is a given name popular among Iranians referring to the imams of Shia Islam Ali and Ali al-Ridha.

People

Ali Reza
 Ali-Reza Asgari, Iranian general 
 Ali Reza Eftekhari, Iranian pop singer
 Ali Reza Nobari, Iranian economist
 Ali Reza Pahlavi (born 1922), member of the Pahlavi dynasty
 Ali Reza Pahlavi (born 1966), member of the Pahlavi dynasty
  Dr. Ali Reza Rajabzadeh, Consultant, Staff Troy University

Ali Rıza
 Ali Rıza Binboğa (born 1950), Turkish singer
 Ali Rıza Efendi (1839–1888), father of Mustafa Kemal Atatürk
 Ali Rıza Pasha (1860–1932), one of the last grand viziers of the Ottoman Empire
 Ali Rıza Pasha (governor of Baghdad)
 Ali Rıza Seyfi (1879–1958), Turkish novelist, historian and poet

Alireza
 Alireza Akbarpour, Iranian footballer
 Alireza Assar, Iranian pop singer
 Alireza Beiranvand, Iranian footballer
 Alireza Firouzja, French-Iranian chess grandmaster
 Alireza Ghorbani, Iranian musician
 Alireza Jafarzadeh, Iranian activist
 Alireza Jahanbakhsh, Iranian footballer
 Alireza Khamseh, Iranian actor
 Alireza Mansourian, Iranian footballer
 Alireza Marandi, Iranian physician
 Alireza Mashayekhi, Iranian musician
 Alireza Nourizadeh, Iranian scholar
 Alireza Rezaei, Iranian wrestler
 Alireza Sagharchi, British-Iranian architect
 Alireza Talischi, Iranian pop singer
 Alireza Vahedi Nikbakht, Iranian footballer

Aliriza
 Ali Riza Dede, Albanian dedebaba of the Bektashi Order

Arabic masculine given names
Iranian masculine given names
Turkish masculine given names